Mari Hietala (born 10 November 1969) is a Finnish cross-country skier. She competed in the women's 15 kilometre freestyle event at the 1994 Winter Olympics.

Cross-country skiing results
All results are sourced from the International Ski Federation (FIS).

Olympic Games

World Championships

World Cup

Season standings

References

External links
 

1969 births
Living people
Finnish female cross-country skiers
Olympic cross-country skiers of Finland
Cross-country skiers at the 1994 Winter Olympics
People from Muonio
Sportspeople from Lapland (Finland)
20th-century Finnish women